The 1934–35 Washington Huskies men's basketball team represented the University of Washington for the  NCAA college basketball season. Led by fifteenth-year head coach Hec Edmundson, the Huskies were members of the Pacific Coast Conference and played their home games on campus at the UW Pavilion in Seattle, Washington.

The National Invitation Tournament (NIT) debuted in 1938, and the NCAA tournament in 1939.

References

External links
Sports Reference – Washington Huskies: 1934–35 basketball season
Washington Huskies men's basketball media guide (2009–10) – History

Washington Huskies men's basketball seasons
Washington Huskies
Washington
Washington